Yin Lu (Chinese: 尹路; Pinyin: Yǐn Lù;  born 3 January 1989 in Jinzhou) is a Chinese footballer who currently plays for China League One side Inner Mongolia Zhongyou.

Club career
Yin started his professional career with China League Two side Shaanxi Star in 2008. He joined a new founded club Dalian Aerbin in 2009. He made 17 appearances and scored 2 goals in the 2010 season as Dalian Aerbin finished the first place and won promotion to League One. Liu went on to appear 13 times in the League One, the club won two consecutive champions and promotions and enter the top flight in the 2011 season. He scored his first Super League goal on 6 May 2012, in a 2–1 away defeat against Guangzhou Evergrande.
Yin transferred to Chinese Super League side Jiangsu Sainty in January 2013. In July 2014, Yin moved to China League Two side Taiyuan Zhongyou Jiayi until 31 December 2014.

On 5 February 2018, Yin transferred to fellow China League One side Dalian Transcendence.

Career statistics 
Statistics accurate as of match played 31 December 2019.

Honours
Dalian Aerbin
 China League One: 2011
 China League Two: 2010

Jiangsu Suning
Chinese FA Super Cup: 2013

References

External links
 

Living people
1989 births
People from Jinzhou
Chinese footballers
Footballers from Liaoning
Dalian Professional F.C. players
Jiangsu F.C. players
Inner Mongolia Zhongyou F.C. players
Dalian Transcendence F.C. players
Chinese Super League players
China League One players
China League Two players
Association football defenders